Cherrington is an English surname that may refer to
Anthony Cherrington (born 1988), New Zealand rugby league footballer
Ben Mark Cherrington (1885–1980), Chancellor at the University of Denver, U.S.
Cecil Cherrington (1877–1950), Anglican Bishop
Dewayne Cherrington (born 1990), American football defensive tackle 
Ernest Cherrington (1877–1950), American journalist 
Manaia Cherrington (born 1994), New Zealand rugby league footballer
Nau Cherrington (1924–1979), New Zealand rugby union player 
Norman Cherrington (1935–2010), English rugby league footballer 
Te Paea Cherrington (c.1878–1937), New Zealand tribal leader
Peter Cherrington (1917–1945), English cricketer 

English-language surnames